William Henry Gilder (September 17, 1812 – April 13, 1864) was a Methodist clergyman.

Biography
William Henry Gilder was born in Philadelphia, Pennsylvania. His father, John Gilder, laid the cornerstone of Girard College. The son was educated at Wesleyan University, became a preacher in the Methodist Church, and was afterward ordained. In 1836 he made an equestrian tour of the southern states, going as far as New Orleans. In 1840 he began the publication of the Philadelphia Repository, a literary monthly, but discontinued it at the end of a year. Subsequently he published for a few years in Philadelphia the Literary Register, a quarterly review. In 1842, he established Bellevue Female Seminary in Bordentown, New Jersey, which in 1848 he moved to Flushing, New York. In 1857 it was chartered as a college. He became chaplain of the 40th regiment of New York volunteers at the beginning of the civil war, and remained in active service until his death. He died in Brandy Station, Virginia in 1864.

Family
He married Jane Nutt. Their children:
 William Henry Gilder, an explorer
 Richard Watson Gilder, a poet and editor
 Jeannette Leonard Gilder, a journalist
 Joseph Benson Gilder, an editor

Notes

References
 

1812 births
1864 deaths
Wesleyan University alumni
American Methodist clergy
Methodists from Pennsylvania
Union Army chaplains
Clergy from Philadelphia
19th-century American clergy
19th-century Methodist ministers